Emma Finucane (born 22 December 2002) is a British and Welsh track cyclist.

Cycling career
Having previously won two silver medals at the 2020 British National Track Championships, Finucane became a British champion when winning the team sprint event at the 2022 British National Track Championships. She also won a silver medal and two bronze medals at the same Championships. 

Later that year, Finucane went on to win bronze medals in both the sprint and team sprint at the Commonwealth Games.

Finucane was the star of the 2023 British Cycling National Track Championships, after she won four national titles (taking her total to 5). They were the 500 m Time trial, the Sprint, the Keirin and s second team sprint title.

Major results
2022
National Track Championships
1st  Team sprint (with Rhian Edmunds and Lowri Thomas)
Commonwealth Games
3rd  Team sprint (with Rhian Edmunds and Lowri Thomas)
3rd  Sprint
UCI Track World Championships
3rd  Team sprint (with Lauren Bell and Sophie Capewell)

References

Living people
2002 births
British female cyclists
British track cyclists
Welsh track cyclists
Welsh female cyclists
Cyclists at the 2022 Commonwealth Games
Commonwealth Games competitors for Wales
Commonwealth Games medallists in cycling
Commonwealth Games bronze medallists for Wales
Medallists at the 2022 Commonwealth Games